Haidian may refer to:

 Haidian District, a district in Beijing, China
 Haidian River, in Haikou, Hainan, China
 Haidian Island, in Haikou, Hainan, China
 Haidian Huangzhuang station, subway station in Beijing
 Haidian Wuluju station, subway station in Beijing